"You Better Think Twice" is a song co-written and recorded by American country music artist Vince Gill.  It was released in May 1995 as the fifth single from the album When Love Finds You.  The song reached number 2 on the Billboard Hot Country Singles & Tracks chart, behind Shania Twain's "Any Man Of Mine".  It was written by Gill and Reed Nielsen.

Critical reception
Deborah Evans Price, of Billboard magazine reviewed the song favorably saying that Gill continues to "pump out solid, if what somewhat predictable, material like this guitar fueled country-rocker."

Personnel
Compiled from the liner notes.
Barry Beckett – piano additions
Vince Gill – lead and backing vocals, electric guitar, electric guitar solo
John Barlow Jarvis – piano
Jonell Mosser – backing vocals
Steve Nathan – Hammond B-3 organ, synthesizer 
Tom Roady – percussion
Michael Rhodes – bass guitar
Randy Scruggs – acoustic guitar
Steuart Smith – electric guitar
Billy Thomas – backing vocals
Carlos Vega – drums
Pete Wasner – keyboards

Chart performance
"You Better Think Twice" debuted at number 63 on the U.S. Billboard Hot Country Singles & Tracks for the week of May 13, 1995.

Year-end charts

References

1995 singles
Vince Gill songs
Songs written by Vince Gill
Songs written by Reed Nielsen
Song recordings produced by Tony Brown (record producer)
MCA Records singles
1994 songs